The Giriraja is a breed of chicken developed by Karnataka Veterinary, Animal, and Fishery Sciences University in Bengaluru, India. 

Giriraja females lay a large number of eggs, 130–150 per year, with each egg weighing 52–55 grams. The eggs have a good hatchability (80–85 per cent), and enable farmers to raise their own stock. Their shells are brown in color and thicker than that of other commercial eggs, and resist breaking. The birds exhibit better growth compared to local varieties, and are suited for mixed and backyard farming.

For backyard rearing, a flock of five hens and one rooster is ideally grown. No special care is required to grow them. They can be raised as free range birds and can be fed with locally available materials. Being good scavengers, they feed on a variety of insects and green foliage. They can also be fed on farm and kitchen waste. The birds are resistant to many diseases, an exception being Ranikhet (also called Newcastle disease, is a contagious and highly fatal viral disease caused by paramyxoviruses) disease.

A day-old chick weighs 42–45 g.

References

Chicken breeds originating in India